Sultan Deria Hassan was a Somali ruler. He was the fourth Grand Sultan of the Isaaq Sultanate and known as a shrewd and wise leader.

Biography

Somaliland and a Visit to Abyssinia: with supplementary preface on the 'Mad Mullah' risings|last=Carlos-Swayne|first=Harald|publisher=|isbn=|location=|pages=15–20}}</ref> Deria was the longest reigning Sultan having ascended to the throne in the late 19th century and dying of old age in the late 1930s, where he was succeeded by his eldest son, Abdulrahman. By the end of his reign Deria was reported to be nearly a hundred years old. Deria also regularly exacted tribute from the Isaaq sub-clans. Deria would meet with Sheikh Madar outside Hargeisa in a famous 1870 shir to discuss issues regarding the new town of Hargeisa and agreed that poaching and tree cutting in the vicinity should be banned.

Reign
As Sultan of Isaaq, he also was the paramount leader of his [[habar awal] clan. Standing against him was a similarly skilled poet and warrior Hersi Absiyeh, a prominent member of the closely related Rer Abdi Bari who were warring with the Rer Guled. He called for the regular shir or meeting of subclans where he would take council and advise on what decisions to make next for the Eidagale. Sultan Deria ruled that blood payment or mag was sufficient for both parties to exchange at the shir with the Rer Guled losing six and the Abdi Bari six as well. Hussein Hasan was boastful and urged for continued conflict with this rousing gabay rejecting the decision.

Sultan Deria responded by sending Hussein away to Berbera and then resuming the shir. Absiyeh was made to swear a solemn oath not to recite a gabay following the Sultan's decision but he could not resist, especially since Hussein was away. Hussein returned and lamented that he missed the occasion and the two other men (Deria and Absiyeh) prevailed that day.

Dervish Era
In the year 1899, Sultan Deria Hassan received one of the earliest letters sent by Muhammad Abdullah Hassan to garner support for the then fledgling Dervish Movement. This shows how influential Sultan Deria was in the Somali north since he was earnestly implored by the Mullah to join him in his endeavors. 

I have the honour to enclose a translation of a letter from the Mullah Muhammad Abdullah to the Aidagalleh, as a specimen of the manner in which he has been trying to seduce the tribes from their allegiance to us. Although this letter has only come into my hands there is reason to believe that it reached Sultan Deria of the Aidagalleh some two months ago, for the Sheikh Madar tells me that about that time Sultan Deria sent a message to him saying that he had heard from the Mullah and asking his advice as to whether he should join him or not.

It appears that Deria heeded the call for support as the Sultan instigated a major insurrection in the town of Hargeisa as well as supplying Abdullah Hassan with vital information.

Lieutenant Byrne reports to me that Sultan Deria is the principal cause of unrest around Hargaisa. He is in communication with the Mullah, supplying him with information and giving every assistance prior to joining him himself.

Rebellions
Deria's reign saw some instability and revolts that were swiftly contained. Swayne recounts an incident where a portion of the Eidagale broke away, but were quickly brought to heel.

The late Assistant Resident at Berbera had a case brought before him in which a part of the Eidegale tribe had thrown off allegiance to Sultan Deria, and when his intervention was successful, one of the terms proposed by the delinquents themselves was that they would stand before him as a recognition of their return to his control.

See also
Somali aristocratic and court titles
Garhajis
Hussein Hasan poet and warrior
Nur Ahmed Aman contemporary of Sultan Deria Hassan and Sultan of the Habr Yunis
Abdillahi Deria the son and successor of Sultan Deria Hassan
Farah Nur
Isaaq

References

19th-century Somalian people
20th-century Somalian people
Year of birth missing
Grand Sultans of the Isaaq Sultanate